Miss Goiás is a Brazilian Beauty pageant which selects the representative for the State of Goiás at the Miss Brazil contest. The pageant was created in 1954 and has been held every year since with the exception of 1990 and 1993. The pageant is held annually with representation of several municipalities. Since 2021, the State director of Miss Goiás is, Raffael Rodrigues. Goiás still has yet to win a Miss Brazil national crown.

Results Summary

Placements
Miss Brazil: 
1st Runner-Up: Suzane Ferreira de Andrade (1979); Ana Amélia Carneiro (1987);  (2003)
2nd Runner-Up: Nara Rúbia Vieira Monteiro (1970); Cynthia Cordeiro e Souza (2008)
3rd Runner-Up: Marlene de Oliveira Prates (1971); Selva Rios Campêllo (1977); Sylvia Beatriz Pires Deja (1989)
4th Runner-Up: 
Top 5/Top 7/Top 8: Rosa Pereira de Lima (1974); Maria de Fátima Borges (1975);  (2014)
Top 10/Top 11/Top 12: Melissandra Silésia Volpon (1978); Zélia Gonçalves Ribeiro (1980);  (1981); Marlene Curado Carvalho (1982); Jacqueline Marie Campos (1983); Cristiane Corrales Ferreira (1988); Karina Paula Marin (1995); Ana Paula Bongers (1998); Jelly Silva da Silveira (2000); Michelly Prado Borges (2001); Luana de Oliveira Chaves (2002); Thaynara Fernandes (2015); Mônica Priscila França (2016); Giovanna Veríssimo (2018)
Top 15/Top 16: Liandra Andrade Schmidt (2007); Anielly Campos Barros (2009); Jeovanca Nascimento (2017)

Special Awards
Miss Photogenic: Michelly Prado Borges (2001)
Miss Congeniality: Maria Ada da Cunha (1968); Thays Bitencourt (1999)
Miss Elegance: Karina Paula Marin (1995)
Miss Be Emotion: Giovanna Veríssimo (2018)
Miss Smile/Best Smile: Sivone Ramos Soares (1985)
Best State Costume: Sileimã Alves Pinheiro (2013)

Titleholders

Table Notes

References

External links
Official Miss Brasil Website

Women in Brazil
Beauty pageants in Brazil
Miss Brazil state pageants